BBC Sky at Night magazine is a British monthly magazine about astronomy aimed at amateur astronomers and published by Immediate Media Company. Its title is taken from the television programme produced by the BBC, The Sky at Night. The magazine, in comparison with the TV series, includes more technical and scientific information. Until 2015, it also included a bonus CD-ROM with software programs, latest astronomical photographs, written materials and 'classic' episodes of The Sky at Night from the BBC archives (from 2015, the monthly content was moved online).

History
BBC Sky at Night was launched in 2005.  The first issue, which featured Patrick Moore on the cover and included a copy of Moore's Moon map as a free gift, sold out and back issues are no longer available.  Copies of Issue 1 have since sold for over £100 on eBay. In April 2007, the magazine celebrated the 50th anniversary of The Sky at Night on BBC TV with a specially-themed issue, which was produced in two different covers.

Patrick Moore was an editorial advisor serving as Editor Emeritus, along with Chris Lintott, serving as Contributing Editor respectively.

References

External links
BBC Sky at Night magazine
BBC Sky at Night magazine forum
BBC Magazines Bristol
The Sky at Night TV programme homepage

2005 establishments in the United Kingdom
Astronomy in the United Kingdom
Astronomy magazines
BBC publications
Monthly magazines published in the United Kingdom
Science and technology magazines published in the United Kingdom
Magazines established in 2005